The 2012 Monviso-Venezia — Il Padania was the second edition of the race, held in 2011 as Giro di Padania. The race started on 3 September in Sant'Agostino and ended on 7 September in Frabosa Soprana, passing through the area struck by an earthquake in May 2012.

19 teams and 152 riders participated to the race. The 2011 winner Ivan Basso did not take part in the race, with 2010 Vuelta a España winner Vincenzo Nibali leading team Liquigas–Cannondale instead. Other notable riders who participated were the winner of the 2011 Giro d'Italia Michele Scarponi, the sprinter Alessandro Petacchi, the 2012 Italian Road Race Champion Franco Pellizotti and the 2004 Liège–Bastogne–Liège winner Davide Rebellin.

The race was dominated by Vincenzo Nibali (Liquigas–Cannondale), who took the leader's jersey on the third stage (won by Oscar Gatto), won the fourth stage and the General classification as well as the Points and King of the Mountains classifications. Acqua & Sapone's Carlos Betancur won the Young Rider classification, and Androni Giocattoli finished first in the Team classification.

Race Overview

Final standings

General Classification

Points Classification

King of the Mountains Classification

Young Rider Classification

References

2012 in Italian sport
2012 in road cycling